The Presidency of Néstor Kirchner began on 25 May 2003, when Néstor Kirchner became President of Argentina. He was the Governor of Santa Cruz during the 2003 general election, he was elected second to Carlos Menem but became president when Menem refused to go for a required runoff election. In elections of October 2007, he declined for a second term and was later succeeded by his wife, Cristina Fernández de Kirchner as President.

2003 presidential election

Even though Kirchner ran for presidency with the support of Eduardo Duhalde, he was not the initial candidate chosen by the president. Trying to prevent a third term of Carlos Menem, he sought to promote a candidate that may defeat him, but Carlos Reutemann (governor of Santa Fe) did not accept and José Manuel de la Sota (governor of Córdoba) did not grow in the polls. He also tried with Mauricio Macri, Adolfo Rodríguez Saá, Felipe Solá and Roberto Lavagna, to no avail. He initially resisted helping Kirchner, fearing that he may ignore Duhalde once in the presidency.

Kirchner's electoral promises included "returning to a republic of equals". After the first round of the election, Kirchner visited the president of Brazil, Luiz Inácio Lula da Silva, who received him enthusiastically. He also declared he was proud of his radical left-wing political past.

Although Menem, who was president from 1989 to 1999, won the first round of the election on April 27, 2003, he only got 24% of the valid votes — just 2% ahead of Kirchner. This was an empty victory, as Menem was viewed very negatively by much of the Argentine population and had virtually no chance of winning the runoff election. After days of speculation, during which polls forecast a massive victory for Kirchner with about a 30%–40% difference, Menem finally decided to stand down. This automatically made Kirchner president of Argentina, despite having secured only 22% of the votes in the election, the lowest percentage gained by the eventual winner of an Argentine presidential election. He was sworn in on 25 May 2003 to a four-year term of office.

Policies

Economy

Argentina had faced a serious economic crisis in previous years, which led to the 2001 riots and the fall of Fernando de la Rúa. Eduardo Duhalde was appointed president, and with his minister Roberto Lavagna he improved national economy. Although Duhalde had to resign as well, for political reasons, and the economic improvement was not enough to turn him into a popular candidate, by the time he handed government to Kirchner the most critical periods were already endured and the economy was already in a growing tendency. The growth of Argentina during 2003, an effect of the economic recovery, was the highest in all Latin America.

Kirchner kept the Duhalde administration's Minister of the Economy, Roberto Lavagna. Lavagna also declared that his first priority now was social problems. Argentina's default was the largest in financial history, and it gave Kirchner and Lavagna significant bargaining power with the IMF, which loathes having bad debts on its books. During his first year of office, Kirchner achieved a difficult agreement to reschedule $84 billion in debts with international organizations, for three years. As of 2004, the initial indulgence ended, and the economic recovery induced the foreign powers to request a normalization in debt payment. Although the IMF was highly unpopular in Argentina, Kirchner's good image (nearing 71% by that point) did not lower more than three or five points; with the exception of the far-left, most society was concerned with the possible consequences of a complete default.

In the first half of 2005, the government launched a bond exchange to restructure approximately $81 billion of national public debt (an additional $20 billion in past defaulted interest was not recognized). Over 76% of the debt was tendered and restructured for a recovery value of approximately one third of its nominal value.

On 15 December 2005, following Brazil's initiative, Kirchner announced the cancellation of Argentina's debt to the IMF in full and offered a single payment, in a historic decision that generated controversy at the time (see Argentine debt restructuring). Some commentators, such as Mark Weisbrot of the Center for Economic and Policy Research, suggest that the Argentine experiment has thus far proven successful. Others, such as Michael Mussa, formerly on the staff of the International Monetary Fund and now with the Peterson Institute, question the longer-term sustainability of Pres. Kirchner's approach.

In a meeting with executives of multinational corporations on Wall Street—after which he was the first Argentine president to ring the opening bell at the New York Stock Exchange—Kirchner defended his "heterodox economic policy, within the canon of classic economics" and criticized the IMF for its lack of collaboration with the Argentine recovery.

Domestic policy
When he was elected, Kirchner represented Duhalde in the long conflict between Menem and Duhalde. This allowed him to secure the loyalty of most of the Justicialist Party, but also limited his chances of being seen as a political renovator. The low support in the elections became a problem for him, due to the high presidentialism in the politics of Argentina. The new governors, legislators and mayors took office nearly 6 months after Kirchner. As a result, he sought support from other social forces, such as Hugo Moyano from the General Confederation of Labour (CGT) or the piquetero Luis D'Elía. Although this forces shared a common leader, they had disputes with each other. A political parade on 11 March 2004, in remembrance of the electoral victory of Héctor José Cámpora in 1973, ended in a violent dispute between Moyano and D'Elía. This extrapartidary support, known as transversalism, was combined with the supremacy of the Justicialist Party. The Justicialist congress was summoned on 26 March 2004, and gave the presidency of the party (headed by former president Carlos Menem by that point) to the governor of Jujuy, the kirchnerist Eduardo Fellner. Kirchner refused to run for the presidency of the party himself, in order to give priority and credibility to the transversalist project. Other supports from outside the party were the mayors Aníbal Ibarra (Buenos Aires), Miguel Lifschitz (Rosario) and Luis Juez (Córdoba), from centre-left local parties, and the last two in ongoing conflicts with the local branches of the PJ. As a response, Duhalde, the vicepresident Daniel Scioli and governors as José Manuel de la Sota and Jorge Obeid gathered in a congress and reaffirmed their peronist loyalty, rejecting the transversalism.

Shortly after coming into office, Kirchner made changes to the Argentine Supreme Court. He accused certain justices of extortion and pressured them to resign, while also fostering the impeachment of two others. In place of a majority of politically right-wing and religiously conservative justices, he appointed new ones who were ideologically closer to him, including two women (one of them an avowed atheist). Kirchner also retired dozens of generals, admirals, and brigadiers from the armed forces, a few of them with reputations tainted by the atrocities of the Dirty War.

2005 elections
Kirchner saw the 2005 parliamentary elections as a means to confirm his political power, since Carlos Menem's defection in the second round of the 2003 presidential elections had not allowed Kirchner to receive the large number of votes that surveys predicted. Kirchner explicitly stated that the 2005 elections would be like a mid-term plebiscite for his administration, and he actively participated in the campaign in most provinces. Due to internal disagreements, the Justicialist Party was not presented as such on the polls but split into several factions. Kirchner's Frente para la Victoria (FPV, Front for Victory) was overwhelmingly the winner (the candidates of the FPV got more than 40% of the national vote), following which many supporters of other factions (mostly those led by former presidents Eduardo Duhalde and Carlos Menem) migrated to the FPV.

Human rights

Néstor Kirchner made a priority of his presidency to reopen the cases related with the 1970s Dirty War. His main perspective was that the conflict was still ongoing. He started by removing the top military personnel, annulling a decree by Fernando de la Rúa that prevented extraditions, and promoted the annulment of the laws of Full Stop and Due Obedience that benefited the military of the National Reorganization Process in the 1980s.

Foreign policy
Under Duhalde, Argentine foreign policy shifted from the "automatic alignment" with the United States during the 1990s, to one stressing stronger ties (economic and political) within Mercosur and with other Latin American countries, and rejecting the Free Trade Area of the Americas. Néstor Kirchner kept that policy.

Conflict with Uruguay

Controversies

Disappearance of Julio López

Skanska

Major legislation

 Derogation of the law of Full stop
 Derogation of the law of Obediencia Debida

2007 election

On 2 July 2007, President Kirchner announced he would not seek re-election in the October elections, despite having the support of 60% of those surveyed in polls. Instead, Kirchner intended to focus on the creation of a new political party.

Personnel

Cabinet

See also
 Presidency of Cristina Fernández de Kirchner

Bibliography

References

 
Néstor Kirchner
Kirchner, Nestor
2003 establishments in Argentina
2007 disestablishments in Argentina